The 1995 Canberra by-election was held in the Australian electorate of Canberra in Australian Capital Territory on 25 March 1995. The by-election was triggered by the resignation of the sitting member, the Australian Labor Party's Ros Kelly on 30 January 1995. The writ for the by-election was issued on 17 February 1995.

The by-election was won by Liberal Party candidate Brendan Smyth, making it the first (and currently the only) by-election in the ACT to have been won by the Liberal Party.

The by-election took place in the shadow of the "sports rorts" affair which resulted in Kelly's resignation as a minister.

Smyth would later contest the new seat of Namadgi at the 1996 election but was defeated. Subsequent to his career in Federal Parliament, Smyth became leader of the ACT Liberal Party from 2002 to 2006.

Results

See also
 List of Australian federal by-elections

References

1995 elections in Australia
Australian Capital Territory federal by-elections
1990s in the Australian Capital Territory
March 1995 events in Australia